The 2014 Hat Yai Bombings happened on 6 May 2014, when three improvised explosive devices exploded roughly seven minutes apart in the heart of Hat Yai, Thailand in the afternoon, wounding at least eight people.

Attacks
The first  went off at about 1:30 pm in front of 7 Eleven convenience store on Ponpichai Road and shortly after the second bomb went off near the police flats opposite Hat Yai police station. The blast damaged many vehicles as the bomb had been placed near the police station's parking area. Later, two more blasts hit near Hat Yai Junction Railway Station as well as close to the Robinson department store.

A further bomb was found near the flats in Prince of Songkhla Hospital but the bomb squad was able to defuse it in time.

Suspects
Although nobody claimed responsibility for the attacks, police said they suspected Muslim insurgents were responsible for the attacks.

See also 
 South Thailand insurgency

References

South Thailand insurgency
Terrorist incidents in Thailand in 2014
Songkhla province
Car and truck bombings in Asia
Improvised explosive device bombings in Thailand
Islamic terrorism in Thailand
Religiously motivated violence in Thailand
Attacks in Asia in 2014
Mass murder in 2014
2014 crimes in Thailand
Attacks in Thailand